Auensee is a lake in Swabia, Bavaria, Germany. It lies at an elevation of 498 m and its surface area is 18 ha.

Lakes of Bavaria